Canadian Forces Station Inuvik was a signals intercept facility located near Inuvik, Northwest Territories.

The site started as NRS Inuvik (1961), was commissioned HMCS INUVIK (1963), and with armed forces unification became CFS Inuvik (1966).

A Pusher CDAA antenna array was used for HFDF operations.

The station closed in 1986.

References

External links
 Badge
 Station designator
 

Inuvik
Inuvik
Inuvik